Anna Torrodà Ricart (born 21 January 2000) is a Spanish professional footballer who plays as a midfielder for Liga F club Valencia CF and the Spain women's national team.

Club career
Following five seasons in the youth tiers at Barcelona, Torrodà joined Espanyol in 2018, signing an initial one year contract. She had previously been with Espanyol between the ages of nine and 13. In June 2020, she signed a three year contract with Valencia.

International career
Representing Spain, Torrodà won the 2018 UEFA Under-19 Championship. Her performances led to her being named in the Team of the Tournament. Torrodà made her debut for the national team on 15 June 2021, coming on as a substitute for Patricia Guijarro against Denmark.

References

2000 births
Living people
Women's association football midfielders
Spanish women's footballers
Spain women's international footballers
Footballers from Barcelona
RCD Espanyol Femenino players
Valencia CF Femenino players
FC Barcelona Femení players
Sportswomen from Catalonia
Spain women's youth international footballers